Classixx is an American electronic music record production and DJ duo, based in Los Angeles, composed of Michael David and Tyler Blake.

History
Tyler Blake and Michael David, childhood friends, started a DJ duo in the suburbs of Los Angeles. The name Classixx came from their liking of classic compilations of different music. The DJ duo is influenced by a plethora of music, ranging from old school R&B to Paul Simon to Kraftwerk.

The duo currently reside in the greater Los Angeles metropolitan area. Michael David married Katie Gravette in 2011. David and Blake are childhood friends and attended the same middle school and high school together.

Career
David spent the first half of the 2000s releasing his own music and touring in a band as a guitar player while Blake attended the Berklee School of Music. In 2005, David left his previous band and Blake dropped out of music school.  Soon after, Classixx was formed. In their early twenties, Classixx were part of the new wave of the Los Angeles electronic music. A change from the banger-driven electro that had been dominating dance floors, their sound was a smooth blend of disco, new wave, funk, house, and indie rock. Recent remixes for groundbreaking and diverse artists include Phoenix, Mayer Hawthorne, Holy Ghost, Ladyhawke, Fischerspooner, Groove Armada, Yacht, Beni, Drop the Lime and Major Lazer. According to Chicagoist, Classixx "became staples in DJ sets all over the world".

Pitchfork Media wrote that the duo gave Phoenix's "Lisztomania" "a gorgeously pillowy synth-disco framework". The Los Angeles Times called it "pure disco cotton candy".

Classixx's debut single, "I'll Get You" featuring Jeppe (Junior Senior), was released in the summer of 2009 on Paris based Kitsune Records.

Classixx's first album, Hanging Gardens, was released on May 14, 2013 via Innovative Leisure.

Classixx announced their second album Faraway Reach via Instagram on February 17, 2016. The album features guest appearances by Passion Pit, T-Pain, De Lux, Alex Frankel, How to Dress Well, Nonku, Harriet Brown, Isles and Panama and was released on June 3, 2016.

In 2017, they worked with Panama on his EP 'Hope for Something'.

Discography
Studio albums
Hanging Gardens (Innovative Leisure · 2013)
Faraway Reach (Innovative Leisure · 2016)

Singles
"Cold Act Ill" (In Stereo · 2008)
"I'll Get You (feat. Jeppe)" (Kitsune Records · 2009)
"Into the Valley" featuring Karl Dixon (Green Label Sound · 2011)
"Holding On" (Innovative Leisure · 2013)
"All You're Waiting For" featuring Nancy Whang (Innovative Leisure · 2013)
"Santa Domino" (Innovative Leisure · 2013)
"A Stranger Love" (Innovative Leisure · 2014)
"Whatever I Want" featuring T-Pain (Innovative Leisure · 2015)
"Just Let Go" featuring How To Dress Well (Innovative Leisure · 2016)
"Safe Inside" featuring Passion Pit (Innovative Leisure · 2016)
"I Feel Numb" featuring Alex Frankel (Innovative Leisure · 2016)
"Possessive" (Innovative Leisure · 2017)
"Love Me No More" (Innovative Leisure · 2019)
"What's Wrong With That? (Silly Love Songs Rework)" (Innovative Leisure · 2020)
"One More Song" featuring Roosevelt (Innovative Leisure · 2020)
"Francesca"/"Weekends" (collaboration with Local Natives) (Innovative Leisure · 2020)
"Big Rhythm" (Potion Records · 2021)

Original production
Mayer Hawthorne - "No Strings" (Produced by Classixx) (Stones Throw Records · 2010)

Remixes

2009: "Lisztomania" by Phoenix
2009: "Starts With One" by Shiny Toy Guns
2009: "My Love Sees You" by Beni
2009: "I Will Come Back" by Holy Ghost!
2009: "Riddle of Steel" by Guns N' Bombs
2009: "Green Eyed Love" by Mayer Hawthorne
2009: "Cash Flow" by Major Lazer
2009: "We Are Electric" by Fischerspooner
2010: "Psychic City" by Yacht
2010: "Devil's Eyes" by Drop The Lime
2010: "Paper Romance" by Groove Armada
2010: "When Your Love Is Safe" by Active Child
2011: "Reginald's Groove" by Cosmic Kids
2011: "Buzzin'" by Shwayze
2011: "Blue Velvet" by Lana Del Rey
2011: "Lucky Star" by Madonna
2012: "Take a Walk" by Passion Pit
2012: "Move in the Right Direction" by Gossip
2012: "Am I Real?" by Nite Jewel
2013: "You Can't Run From My Love" by Munk & Peaches
2013: "Is This How You Feel?" by The Preatures
2013: "Penny" by Hanni El Khatib
2014: "Always" by Panama
2014: "Sundream" by Rüfüs Du Sol
2015: "The Pleasure Principle by Janet Jackson
2017: "Dark Days" by Local Natives
2017: "Undertow" by Panama (with Turbotito)
2018: "Wolves Still Cry" by Lawrence Rothman
2021: "Good Old Days" by JR JR

References

External links

American electronic music duos
DJ duos
Male musical duos
Record producers from California
Nu-disco musicians
Remixers
Kitsuné artists
Electronic dance music duos